The 2006 AF2 season was the seventh season of the AF2, the Arena Football League's minor league. It was preceded by 2005 and succeeded by 2007. The league champions were the Spokane Shock who capped off an impressive inaugural season with a win over the Green Bay Blizzard in ArenaCup VII.

League info

Standings

 Green indicates clinched playoff berth
 Purple indicates division champion
 Grey indicates best regular season record

Playoffs

ArenaCup VII

ArenaCup VII was the 2006 edition of the AF2's championship game, pairing the Green Bay Blizzard of the American Conference with the Spokane Shock of the National Conference. The Shock rode the arm of Offensive Player of the Game Kyle Rowley and a stout defense to a decisive victory over the Blizzard 57–34. The win by the Shock capped a wildly successful inaugural season that saw them go 14–2 in the regular season and become the first-ever AF2 expansion team to advance to and win the ArenaCup in their first year of existence.

Game stats/notes
Rowley completed 29-of-36 passes for 264 yards and six touchdowns, all of which were game-highs.
Shock DS Rob Keefe was awarded the Cutters Catch of the Game as a result of his one-handed interception off a James MacPherson pass attempt deep in Spokane territory.
Shock WR/DB Kevin Beard set game-highs in receiving with 13 receptions for 122 yards and two touchdowns.
Shock head coach Chris Siegfried earned his 57th win as an AF2 head coach with the ArenaCup victory, the most in league history at the time.  His record was eventually tied in week 17 of the 2007 season, and broken in the first round of the 2007 playoffs by Wilkes-Barre/Scranton Pioneers coach Rich Ingold.
The Shock capped off their inaugural season with a 17-2 overall record.
Green Bay finished the 2006 season with a 12-7 overall record and the team's first-ever American Conference Championship.

External links
 2006 af2 season

Af2 seasons